Abdurrahman Canlı (born 4 May 1997) is a Turkish professional footballer who plays as a midfielder for TFF First League club Bodrumspor.

Professional career
A youth product of Fenerbahçe, Canlı made his professional debut with them in a 2-1 Turkish Cup loss to Gençlerbirliği S.K. on 30 November 2016. He went on successive loans with Sakaryaspor and Tarsus. On 3 September 2019, he signed with Hatayspor. He went on loan to 24 Erzincanspor for the 2019-20 season. He debuted Süper Lig with Hatayspor in a 1–0 win over Kasımpaşa S.K. on 26 September 2021.

On 9 July 2022, Canlı signed with Bodrumspor.

International career
Canlı is a youth international for Turkey, having represented the Turkey U15s, U16, U18s, and U19s.

References

External links
 
 

1997 births
People from Erzurum Province
Living people
Turkish footballers
Turkey youth international footballers
Association football midfielders
Fenerbahçe S.K. footballers
Sakaryaspor footballers
Tarsus Idman Yurdu footballers
Hatayspor footballers
24 Erzincanspor footballers
Boluspor footballers
Süper Lig players
TFF First League players
TFF Second League players
TFF Third League players